Louis Moréri (25 March 1643 – 10 July 1680) was a French priest and encyclopedist.

Life
Moréri was born in 1643 in Bargemon, a village in the ancient province of Provence. His great-grandfather, Joseph Chatranet, a native of Dijon, had settled in Provence under King Charles IX of France and taken the name of the village of Moréri, which he acquired through marriage.

Louis Moréri studied humanities in Draguignan and later rhetoric and philosophy at the Jesuit College of Aix-en-Provence. He then studied theology, obtaining his doctoral degree, and was ordained a priest in Lyon. During his stay in Lyon, he published several works, among them La pratique de la perfection chrétienne et religieuse (1667), a translation of the work of the Spanish Jesuit theologian, Alonso Rodriguez. It was probably in Lyon that he met Samuel Chappuzeau, who claimed to have first given him the idea of writing his encyclopedia.

In 1675, shortly after publishing the first edition of his encyclopedia, Moréri accompanied his bishop to Paris, where he became acquainted with Simon Arnauld, Marquis de Pomponne, then the minister of foreign affairs. Three years later, he was hired to be a tutor for Pomponne's children. During this time, he worked on a second edition of his encyclopedia. In 1680, midway through the printing of the second edition, he died of tuberculosis.

Legacy

Moréri's encyclopedia, Le Grand Dictionaire historique, ou le mélange curieux de l'histoire sacrée et profane (literally, The Great Historical Dictionary, or Curious Anthology of Sacred and Secular History, although it was translated differently into English at the time) was first published in Lyon in 1674. The encyclopedia focused almost exclusively on historical and biographical articles. Moréri dedicated it to Gaillard de Longjumeau, the Bishop of Apt, to whom he had been appointed chaplain. Moréri's one-volume edition of 1674 and posthumous two-volume edition of 1681 were revised and expanded by others after his death. At least twenty-four editions were published between 1674 (one volume) and 1759 (ten volumes). The encyclopedia was also translated and adapted into English, German, Dutch and Spanish.

Moréri's Grand Dictionaire historique gave rise to a more famous encyclopedia, Pierre Bayle's ''The Historical and Critical Dictionary (1697). Bayle conceived his work as correcting and making up for deficiencies of Moréri's work.

References

See also
 List of Roman Catholic scientist-clerics
 Digital Dictionnaire de Moréri at the ARTFL Project

References

External links

1643 births
1680 deaths
French encyclopedists
Catholic clergy scientists
17th-century French Roman Catholic priests
People from Provence
17th-century deaths from tuberculosis
French male non-fiction writers
Tuberculosis deaths in France